Benito Salas Vargas (1770 – 18 September 1816) was a military and social leader during Colombia's (then known as New Granada) independence war (1810–1819). He fought against Pablo Morillo during the Spanish reconquest of New Granada. In 1811 he joined the forces of Brigadier Jose Diaz, as part of the army of the United Provinces of New Granada commanded by General Antonio Baraya. On December 8, 1812, in Timaná, he swore recognition to the Congress of the United Provinces. He fought with the troops of Antonio Nariño. On 29 June 1816, he fought in the battle of Cuchilla del Tambo where the patriot troops were defeated by the royalists commanded by Juan José de Sámano y Uribarri. On July 10, 1816, Salas was captured.

In September 1816, by order of the Purificación Tribunal, Salas was executed in Neiva's main square, where his hands and head were exhibited. His head was buried in the terrain which would later become La Manguita Hacienda. In 1936, the Colombian government inaugurated Neiva's airport in the hacienda, and renamed it in 1986 as the Benito Salas Airport in honour of Salas.

References

1770 births
1816 deaths
Colombian independence activists
19th-century executions by Spain
Prisoners and detainees of Spain
People from Huila Department
Executed Colombian people
Social leaders